Hélène Bizot is a French film, stage and voice actress.

She is the regular dubbing voice of Naomi Watts, Rachael Taylor and sometimes Charlize Theron

Roles as a voice actress
 1998: Serial Experiments Lain (as Lain Iwakura)
 1999: GTO (as Tomoko)
 2001: Noir (as Kirika Yuumura)
 2001: Sakura Wars: The Movie (as Sakura Shinguji)
 2002: Ghost in the Shell: Stand Alone Complex (as Motoko Kusanagi)
 2003: Fullmetal Alchemist (as Izumi Curtis)
 2004: Appleseed (as Deunan Knute)
 2005: Ghost in the Shell: S.A.C. 2nd GIG (as Motoko Kusanagi)
 2006: Ghost in the Shell: Stand Alone Complex - Solid State Society (as Motoko Kusanagi)
 2006: Submarine Super 99 (as Ze Stroger, Yana)
 2006: The Girl Who Leapt Through Time (as Makoto Konno)
 2006: Nocturna, la Nuit Magique (as Tim, l'Étoile)
 2006: Splinter cell double agent (as Enrica Villablanca)
 2007: Ghost in the Shell: S.A.C. - The Laughing Man (as Motoko Kusanagi)
 2007: Fullmetal Alchemist the Movie: Conqueror of Shamballa (as Izumi Curtis, Lyra, Dietlinde)
 2014: Watch Dogs (as Clara Lille)
 2014: The Elder Scrolls Online (as various characters)
2015: The Witcher 3 : The Wild Hunt (as Keira Metz)
2016: Raibow Six: Siege (as Mira)

Roles as a stage actress
 1997: Sacré Georges !
 1998: La Jalousie de Barbouille
 2006: Un Héritage pour Deux
 2007: Fin de Terre (as Annia)
 2008: La Perruche et le Poulet (as Suzanne)

Roles as an actress
 1999: Walking in my Father's Footsteps
 2002: Groupe Flag (TV series - two episodes as Julie)
 2003: Poulet Cocotte
 2007: La Taupe (TV)
 2007: La Légende des 3 Clefs (TV)

References

External links
 
 
 Hélèbe Bizot's filmography at actricesdefrance.org 

Living people
French stage actresses
French television actresses
French video game actresses
French voice actresses
Place of birth missing (living people)
Year of birth missing (living people)